The Albany County, New York, Department of Public Works maintains nearly  of roads and 78 bridges as county routes. All county routes in Albany County are signed with a blue pentagonal shield, the Manual on Uniform Traffic Control Devices' standard shield for county routes. Although quite a few county routes are in more than one town, the route number reflects the town that the largest portion of the route is in. Two county routes pass through the western portion of the city of Albany. Parts of New York State Route 32 (NY 32) and NY 155 are owned and maintained by Albany County and are thus co-signed as state touring routes and as Albany County routes.

Routes 1–100

Berne (1–14)
Routes numbered 1 through 14 are predominantly in the town of Berne.

Bethlehem (50–55)
Routes numbered 50 through 55 are predominantly in the town of Bethlehem.

Routes 101–200

Coeymans (101–112)
Routes numbered 101 through 112 are predominantly in the town of Coeymans.

Colonie (151–163)
Routes numbered 151 through 163 are predominantly in the town of Colonie.

Routes 201–300

Guilderland (201–209A)
Routes numbered 201 through 209A are predominantly in the town of Guilderland.

Knox (251–262)
Routes numbered 251 through 262 are predominantly in the town of Knox.

Green Island (278)
George Street, a  street in the village of Green Island, is designated as County Route 278. Maintenance of the route is shared between the county and the village as the village is responsible for everyday maintenance while the county is responsible for reconstruction when it is needed. It is not signed as a county route.

Routes 301–400

New Scotland (301–312)
Routes numbered 301 through 312 are predominantly in the town of New Scotland.

Rensselaerville (351–362)
Routes numbered 351 through 362 are predominantly in the town of Rensselaerville.

Routes 401 and up

Westerlo (401–414)
Routes numbered 401 through 414 are predominantly in the town of Westerlo.

See also

County routes in New York

References

External links
Empire State Roads – Albany County Roads
Albany County Department of Public Works home page